Kathinka von Deichmann was the defending champion, but lost in the first round to Maryna Zanevska.

Wang Xiyu won the title, defeating Dalma Gálfi in the final, 4–6, 6–3, 6–2.

Seeds

Draw

Finals

Top half

Bottom half

References

Main Draw

Torneig Internacional de Tennis Femení Solgironès - Singles